Francisco Tomás García Rodríguez (born 5 November 1975) is a Spanish former professional cyclist.

Major results
1997
1st Stage 5 Troféu Joaquim Agostinho
2nd Circuito Montañés
1999
1st Stage 4 Clásico RCN
2005
1st Gran Premio Área Metropolitana de Vigo

Grand Tour general classification results timeline

References

External links

1975 births
Living people
Spanish male cyclists
Cyclists from Madrid